LaMark Carter (born August 23, 1970 in Shreveport, Louisiana) is an American former triple jumper. He was the silver medallist at the 1999 IAAF World Indoor Championships and also the 1999 Pan American Games. He was a three-time national champion at the USA Outdoor Track and Field Championships (1998, 1999 and 2001).

He made the USA Olympic Team in 2000 but did not medal in the Sydney Games. At the US 2004 Olympic Team Trials he tested positive for the banned substance salbutamol. Carter was a three-time participant at the World Championships in Athletics.

He attended Captain Shreve High School and collegiately he competed for the Northwestern State Demons and Lady Demons. He holds the triple jump meet record for the New Balance Indoor Grand Prix, having jumped  in 1998.

National titles
USA Outdoor Track and Field Championships
Triple jump: 1998, 1999, 2001

International competitions

See also
 List of doping cases in athletics

References

External links
 

1970 births
Living people
Sportspeople from Shreveport, Louisiana
Track and field athletes from Louisiana
American male triple jumpers
African-American male track and field athletes
Olympic track and field athletes of the United States
Athletes (track and field) at the 2000 Summer Olympics
Pan American Games track and field athletes for the United States
Pan American Games medalists in athletics (track and field)
Athletes (track and field) at the 1995 Pan American Games
Athletes (track and field) at the 1999 Pan American Games
World Athletics Championships athletes for the United States
Doping cases in athletics
American sportspeople in doping cases
Northwestern State University alumni
Pan American Games silver medalists for the United States
Universiade medalists in athletics (track and field)
Goodwill Games medalists in athletics
Universiade bronze medalists for the United States
Medalists at the 1995 Summer Universiade
Competitors at the 1998 Goodwill Games
Competitors at the 2001 Goodwill Games
Medalists at the 1999 Pan American Games
21st-century African-American sportspeople
20th-century African-American sportspeople